In numerical analysis, the Cash–Karp method is a method for solving ordinary differential equations (ODEs). It was proposed by Professor Jeff R. Cash  from Imperial College London and Alan H. Karp from IBM Scientific Center. The method is a member of the Runge–Kutta family of ODE solvers. More specifically, it uses six function evaluations to calculate fourth- and fifth-order accurate solutions. The difference between these solutions is then taken to be the error of the (fourth order) solution. This error estimate is very convenient for adaptive stepsize integration algorithms. Other similar integration methods are Fehlberg (RKF) and Dormand–Prince (RKDP).

The Butcher tableau is:

The first row of b coefficients gives the fifth-order accurate solution, and the second row gives the fourth-order solution.

See also 
 Adaptive Runge–Kutta methods
 List of Runge–Kutta methods

Notes

References 
 J. R. Cash, A. H. Karp. "A variable order Runge-Kutta method for initial value problems with rapidly varying right-hand sides", ACM Transactions on Mathematical Software 16: 201-222, 1990. .

Numerical differential equations
Runge–Kutta methods